The Prix Giverny Capital is a bi-annual award for contemporary artists from Quebec, Canada.

About the Prize 
The Giverny Capital Prize, established in 2007 by the portfolio management firm Giverny Capital, is awarded every two years to a visual artist from Quebec, who has been practicing for at least ten years. The prize comes with a grant of $10,000.

Winners of the Prize 
 2007 - Diane Landry
 2009 - Mathieu Beausejour
 2011 -  - [ATSA - Action terroriste socialement acceptable]
 2013 - Jean-Pierre Aube
 2015 - Nelson Henricks
 2017 - Sophie Jodoin
 2019 - Richard Ibghy and Marilou Lemmens
 2020 - Hannah Klaus
 2021 - Karen Tam

References

External links 
 The Prix Giverny Capital/Capital Giverny Prize

Canadian art awards
Contemporary art awards